The Norwegian Capricorn Line was a cruise line and was founded by some of Australia's foremost cruise professionals, (including Sarina Bratton who went on to found the expedition style cruise line Orion Expedition Cruises in 2004) in partnership with Norwegian Cruise Line. The 1997 launch of Norwegian Capricorn Line brought something entirely new to the Asia-Pacific region -- a four star cruise ship based in Australia offering some 35 cruises throughout the year in the waters of Australia, New Zealand and the South Pacific. NCL operated the vessel originally named Royal Viking Sea as the Norwegian Star on several affordable itineraries that included many Queensland ports of call.

When the major partner in Norwegian Capricorn Line, Norwegian Cruise Lines was taken over by Malaysian owned Star Cruises in 2000/2001 the Australian partnership was dissolved and the vessel Norwegian Star became part of Star Cruises fleet and Norwegian Capricorn Line ceased to exist.

The collapse of the company is the subject of the academic paper  The Short, Unhappy Life of an Australia-Based Cruise Line

Fleet 

The sole vessel in Norwegian Capricorn Line's fleet was the 206m, 28 000 tonne Norwegian Star. The Norwegian Star was originally built as the Royal Viking Line cruise ship Royal Viking Sea in 1973. Royal Viking Line were acquired by Knut Kloster of Norwegian Cruise Line in 1984, and initially retained their separate identity. Royal Viking Sea was transferred to Royal Cruise Line in 1990 as the Royal Odyssey (II). The Royal Viking Line name was sold to Cunard in 1994. Royal Odyssey was transferred into the main Norwegian Cruise Line fleet in 1996 as Norwegian Star and in 1997/98 she was transferred to the then newly formed Norwegian Capricorn Line. With Norwegian Capricorn Line, the Norwegian Star carried a maximum of 848 passengers in 424 suites/staterooms. In 2001 she became part of the Star Cruises fleet. After a period laid up, she was placed on weekly cruises from Valencia as Crown Mare Nostrum for Spanish Cruise Line. From 2005 she was running as the MS Albatros (II) for German tour company Phoenix Reisen. 

The name Norwegian Star was transferred to a new build ship, originally planned to be named SuperStar Libra, that was still part of the Norwegian Cruise Line fleet in 2020.

See also 
 List of cruise ships
 List of cruise lines

Defunct cruise lines
Norwegian Cruise Line
Transport companies established in 1997
Transport companies disestablished in 2001